Hydroptila armata is a species in the family Hydroptilidae ("microcaddisflies"), in the order Trichoptera ("caddisflies").
Hydroptila armata is found in North America.

References

Further reading

External links

Notes
 Type locality: United States of America

Hydroptilidae